The men's decathlon at the 1971 European Athletics Championships was held in Helsinki, Finland, at Helsinki Olympic Stadium on 11 and 12 August 1971.

Medalists

Results

Final
11/12 August

Participation
According to an unofficial count, 30 athletes from 16 countries participated in the event.

 (1)
 (3)
 (1)
 (3)
 (3)
 (1)
 (1)
 (1)
 (3)
 (3)
 (1)
 (3)
 (1)
 (1)
 (1)
 (3)

References

Decathlon
Combined events at the European Athletics Championships